The 2000 United States presidential election in Connecticut took place on November 7, 2000, and was part of the 2000 United States presidential election. Voters chose eight representatives, or electors to the Electoral College, who voted for president and vice president.

Connecticut was won by Vice President Al Gore by a 17.5% margin of victory. Gore's vice presidential running mate, Joe Lieberman, had been a U.S. Senator from Connecticut since 1989. Connecticut had also been the birth state of Republican nominee George W. Bush, however as a presidential candidate Bush identified his home state as Texas, where he was governor, and he did not attempt to compete in Connecticut. Connecticut is considered a safe Democratic state, having not been won by a Republican presidential candidate since Bush's father George H. W. Bush in 1988. Connecticut is also the birth state of Bush & major Green Party candidate Ralph Nader.

Bush became the first Republican to win the White House without Fairfield County since James A. Garfield in 1880. This was also the first election since 1976 when Connecticut failed to support the overall winner of the electoral college, and presidency. Bush became the first Republican to win without Connecticut since 1888.

Bush also became the first ever Republican to win without the cities of Norwalk and Stamford and the towns of Canton, Chester, Clinton, Guilford, Lebanon, Pomfret, Stratford, Westbrook, Wethersfield, Willington, and Woodbridge, the first to win without the town of Bethel since it was formed in 1855, the first to win without the town of Old Saybrook since it was formed in 1854, the first to win without the town of Scotland since it was formed in 1861, the first to win without the town of Orange since 1921, the first Republican since Abraham Lincoln in 1864 to win without the town of North Stonington, Ulysses S. Grant in 1868 to win without the town of Seymour, the first Republican since Ulysses S. Grant in 1872 to win without the towns of Andover and Hebron, the first Republican since Rutherford B. Hayes in 1876 to win without the towns of Durham and East Lyme, the first Republican since James Garfield in 1880 to win without the towns of Barkhamsted, North Canaan, Sterling, and Weston, the first Republican since Benjamin Harrison in 1888 to win without the city of Milford and the towns of Bethany, Branford, Burlington, Canaan, Canterbury, Cheshire, Columbia, East Granby, Ellington, Fairfield, Farmington, Glastonbury, Groton, Haddam, Kent, Norfolk, Preston, Salisbury, Sharon, Washington, and Westport, the first Republican since William McKinley in 1900 to win without the towns of Franklin, Killingworth, Salem, and Waterford, the first Republican since Theodore Roosevelt in 1904 to win without the towns of Bolton and Tolland, the first Republican since William Howard Taft in 1908 to win without the town of Old Lyme, the first since Herbert Hoover in 1928 to win without the towns of Bozrah and Marlborough, and the only Republican to win without New Hartford, North Branford, and North Haven.

As of 2020, this was the most recent presidential election in which the Democratic nominee carried the towns of Beacon Falls, Canterbury, Seymour, Sterling, and Wolcott, as well as the most recent presidential election in which the Republican nominee carried the towns of Essex, Lyme, Redding, Roxbury, and Simsbury. This is the most recent occasion where Connecticut voted more Democratic than Vermont and Maryland.

Results

By county

By congressional district
Gore won all 6 congressional districts, including three that elected Republicans.

Electors

Technically the voters of Connecticut cast their ballots for electors: representatives to the Electoral College. Connecticut is allocated 8 electors because it has 6 congressional districts and 2 senators. All candidates who appear on the ballot or qualify to receive write-in votes must submit a list of 8 electors, who pledge to vote for their candidate and his or her running mate. Whoever wins the majority of votes in the state is awarded all 8 electoral votes. Their chosen electors then vote for president and vice president. Although electors are pledged to their candidate and running mate, they are not obligated to vote for them. An elector who votes for someone other than his or her candidate is known as a faithless elector.

The electors of each state and the District of Columbia met on December 18, 2000 to cast their votes for president and vice president. The Electoral College itself never meets as one body. Instead the electors from each state and the District of Columbia met in their respective capitols. 

The following were the members of the Electoral College from the state. All were pledged to and voted for Gore and Lieberman:
Nick Balletto
Frank Cirillo
Marilyn Cohen
Gloria Collins
Kimberly Ford
Thomas McDonough
Ken Slapin
Clorinda Soldevila

See also
 United States presidential elections in Connecticut

References

2000
Connecticut
2000 Connecticut elections